Zorn is an unincorporated community in northern Guadalupe County, Texas, United States.

History
The small town of Zorn was named for the storekeeper Joseph Zorn. Joseph Zorn also served as mayor of Seguin from 1890 to 1910. In the late 1800s Zorn had a population of 150 and two grist mills. The population was 60 as of 2000.

References

External links
 Zorn at Texas Escapes
Zorn from Handbook of Texas online

Unincorporated communities in Texas
Unincorporated communities in Guadalupe County, Texas